"Tidal Wave" is the third single by British DJ and record producer Sub Focus to be released from his second studio album Torus. The song features vocals from Alpines. The song peaked at number 12 on the UK Singles Chart and number four on the UK Dance Chart, making it his highest-charting single until "Endorphins" and "Turn Back Time", which both peaked at number 10 on the UK Singles Chart. It is still his highest-charting single on the UK Dance Chart and his biggest-selling single.

Music video
A music video to accompany the release of "Tidal Wave" was first released onto YouTube on 10 October 2012 at a total length of three minutes and fifty-two seconds. It is set on a rocky coastline (similar to the single cover) and features Catherine Pockson of Alpines singing in the video. The beach is El Matador, close to Los Angeles, United States.

Track listing

Charts and certifications

Weekly charts

Year-end charts

Certifications

Release history

References

2011 songs
2012 singles
Mercury Records singles
RAM Records singles
Songs written by Amanda Ghost
Sub Focus songs
Songs written by Sub Focus